The men's 400 metres event  at the 1993 IAAF World Indoor Championships was held on 12, 13 and 14 March.

Medalists

Results

Heats
First 2 of each heat (Q) and next 2 fastest (q) qualified for the semifinals.

Semifinals
First 2 of each semifinal (Q) and the next 2 fastest (q) qualified for the final.

Final

References

400
400 metres at the World Athletics Indoor Championships